Richard Torrez Jr. (born June 1, 1999) is an American professional boxer. As an amateur, Torrez qualified to represent the United States at the 2020 Olympics where he won a silver medal.

Early life
Richard graduated from Mission Oak High School in 2017.

Amateur career
He won a bronze medal at the 2019 Pan American Games at Super Heavyweight and placed 5th at the 2019 AIBA World Boxing Championships in the same weight class. He won a silver medal at the 2020 Olympics, losing to a professional boxer Bakhodir Jalolov in the final.

Professional career
Richard made his professional debut on March 4, 2022, defeating Allen Melson via KO in the second round.

Professional boxing record

Personal life
Torrez Jr. represents the third generation of a boxing family from San Joaquin Valley, California. His great grandfather, Juan Torrez, emigrated from Fresnillo, Mexico in 1920. His grandfather Manuel Torrez, was a southwest (USA) Golden Gloves champion and his father and coach Richard Torrez Sr. reached the quarterfinals in the U.S. Trials for the 1984 Olympics.

References

External links
 Profile for Richard Torrez Jr. from Team USA
 

1999 births
Living people
Pan American Games bronze medalists for the United States
Pan American Games medalists in boxing
Boxers at the 2019 Pan American Games
Medalists at the 2019 Pan American Games
American male boxers
American boxers of Mexican descent
Boxers at the 2020 Summer Olympics
Medalists at the 2020 Summer Olympics
Olympic silver medalists for the United States in boxing
Olympic boxers of the United States
Boxers from California